In military science nomenclature, a quick reaction force (QRF) is an armed military unit capable of rapidly responding to developing situations, typically to assist allied units in need of such assistance. They are to have equipment ready to respond to any type of emergency, typically within ten minutes or less but that is based on unit standard operating procedures (SOPs). Army cavalry units are frequently postured as quick reaction forces, with a main mission of security and reconnaissance. They are generally platoon-sized in the U.S. military's combat arms.

History
The QRF is a modern military reserve and belongs directly to the commander of the unit it is created from. Depending on the unit size and protocols, the commander may be the only person authorized to control the QRF, or he may delegate this responsibility to one or more additional people.  QRFs are commonly found in maneuver battalion-level task forces and above, in addition to many operating bases having their own dedicated QRF to react to threats on or immediately around the base.

The readiness level of the QRF is based on unit SOPs. Since maintaining a split-second level of readiness is draining on equipment, fuel and personnel, the QRF is postured based on the likelihood of being called up.  During high-intensity conflicts, the QRF may be forced to maintain that split-second level of readiness, and have all members in their vehicles with the motors running. However, during low-intensity conflict, when deployment is less likely and may be more readily predicted, the command establishes how fast the QRF must be able to react, which can range from trucks and personnel in a central location with the troops rotating out of the trucks to the vehicles simply staged close to a unit area, with all personnel staying close enough for rapid recall. The speed at which a QRF is expected to react is defined by its readiness condition, or REDCON, level.

The mission of a QRF can vary widely, as they are used to respond to any threat the commander chooses to employ them for. A U.S. Army QRF consists of a variable number of trucks, generally a mix of M1151 Up-Armored HMMWVs and, since their introduction, MRAPs. Depending on the mission requirement, additional units can be attached to an organic platoon to expand their capabilities. Examples include attaching explosive ordnance disposal (EOD) teams to a QRF responding to bombs or similar threats, and vehicle recovery assets to a QRF expected to recover damaged trucks.

See also
 Base defense operations center
 Force protection
 Rapid reaction force
 Ready Reaction Force
 Immediate Response Force

References 

Force protection tactics
Military units and formations